"The Country Wife" is an episode of the BBC sitcom, The Green Green Grass. It was first screened on 23 September 2005, as the third episode of series one.

Synopsis
Marlene tries her hand at country cooking, despite the warnings from her husband and her son. She demands Boycie goes and picks some berries of the many bushes in their fields even though he is reluctant to do so Boycie takes the basket and leaves. Whilst Boycie is picking berries he meets their next door neighbor – the mad Welsh man, Llewellyn who holds a shotgun to his head whilst giving a lecture about Wales.

Llewellyn latter holds Rocky for ransom when he wanders onto his land. Boycie then seeks legal advice and is told that he has to pay the mad Welsh man.

Episode cast

Production, broadcast and reception

Writing
This episode was written by John Sullivan, writer of Only Fools and Horses. The whole of the first series was written entirely by John Sullivan.

Broadcast
During its original airing, the episode had a viewing audience of 5.86 million, in the 9pm timeslot it was shown. This is the same audiences that sitcoms such as My Family attract.

This episode has since been re-run on BBC1, BBC HD and GOLD. The show received one of the highest ratings of the week making it into the top thirty.

DVD release
The UK DVD release was released on 23 October 2006. The release includes the 2005 Christmas Special, a short special entitled 'Grass Roots' and a short documentary on 'Rocky'.

Continuity
Brief references are made by both Boycie and Marlene regarding their lives in Peckham.

References to Only Fools and Horses
This episode is the first episode of the spin-off comedy series to follow an individual storyline. The episode sees the introduction of series regular, Llewellyn as played by Alan David. The plot of this episode is later referred to in the fourth series episode, 'Please Miss, I Don't Want Anymore'. The last episode in the series to make reference to Only Fools and Horses.

Series developments
This episode sees the first appearance of Llewellyn as played by Alan David.
Boycie considers adding to his livestock by purchasing some cows.

Notes
 This episode marks the second episode in a story arc spanning several series in the form of the gay bull joke.

References

British TV Comedy Guide for The Green Green Grass
BARB viewing figures
The Green Green Grass at BBC Comedy
The Green Green Grass website
British Sitcom Guide for The Green Green Grass
The Green Green Grass at Only Fools and Horses website

2005 British television episodes
The Green Green Grass episodes